The Valles del Tuy metropolitan area is a metropolitan area in Miranda, Venezuela, that includes six municipalities, and is part of the Greater Caracas Area. It had a population of 811,166 inhabitants in 2016.

Cities
The principal cities of the area are:
 Ocumare del Tuy (pop. 127,027)
 Cúa (pop. 110,449)
 Santa Teresa del Tuy (pop. 86,299)
 Charallave (pop. 75,106)
 Santa Lucía (pop. approx. 70,000)
 San Francisco de Yare (pop. 37,261)
 Nueva Cúa (pop. 32,611)

Municipalities

The six municipalities comprising the area are:

Transportation

Rail

Caracas–Cúa branch

The route is part of the Ezequiel Zamora railway axis starts from Caracas and ends in Cúa Miranda State. The main terminal is located next to the Caracas Metro (subway) line 3 La Rinconada Terminal station. This short North-South line can be passenger travelled in approximately, 30 minutes, the following are the names of the 4 stations and the estimated travel time from Caracas and then the additional time to the next station. Also there is a delay time before the train restarts the trip which can be adjusted by management policy.

See also
 Greater Caracas
 List of metropolitan areas of Venezuela

References

External links
 Estado Miranda

Caracas
Geography of Miranda (state)
Metropolitan areas of Venezuela
Articles containing video clips